The Kochechum is a river in Siberia, Russia, it flows through the Syverma Plateau in Krasnoyarsk Krai. It is a right and most significant tributary of the Nizhnyaya Tunguska.

General information 
The part of its basin near the source lies on the southern slopes of Putorana Plateau. It flows to the south direction through Syverma Plateau and joins Nizhnyaya Tunguska near the town Tura. The primary tributaries of the Kochechum are Embenchime, Tembenchi and Turu.

The confluence of Kochechum and Nizhnyaya Tunguska corresponds to the farthest point of fairway section upstream off the Yenisey.

Climatic conditions and water regime 
The basin of the river entirely belongs to the zone of continental subarctic climate. Winter period starts in October and ends in May, during calendar winter temperatures can plummet below . The permafrost effectively blocks any underground supply; all water flowing through the river comes from snow and rain. The river stays ice-bound from October to May or June every year.

As watershed area does not contain any significant lakes. The flow of the Kochechum strongly depends on the season, approaching zero in early spring and reaching its maximum in June. The latter month corresponds to a seasonal inundation, which usually produces 75 percent of the overall annual yield of water.

References

External links
 Kochechum, sci-lib: Great Soviet Encyclopedia

Rivers of Krasnoyarsk Krai